The 2012 European Open Water Swimming Championships was the fourteenth edition of the European Open Water Swimming Championships (but the sixth stand alone after 1989, 1991, 1993, 2008 and 2011 editions) and took part from 12 to 16 September 2012 in Piombino, Italy.

Results

Men

Women

Mixed

Medal table

See also
 2012 European Junior Open Water Swimming Championships
 2012 European Aquatics Championships
 List of medalists at the European Open Water Swimming Championships

References

External links
 Ligue Européenne de Natation LEN Official Website

European Open Water Swimming Championships
European Open Water Championships